Darlene Taylor may refer to:

 Darlene Taylor (Hollyoaks), a character from soap opera Hollyoaks
 Darlene Taylor (politician) (born 1950), member of the Georgia House of Representatives